CKXD-FM (98.7 FM) is a Canadian radio station broadcasting from Gander, Newfoundland and Labrador, at 98.7 MHz with a classic rock format branded on-air as 97.5 K-Rock.

History
The station launched between 1973 and 1974 as CJCR at 1350 kHz, and is currently owned by Stingray Group. In 1977, after Don Jamieson bought out Geoff Stirling's interest in Radio CJYQ-930 Ltd., CJCR was renamed CFYQ. In 1983, Jamieson sold his company to CHUM Limited. In 1989, CHUM Limited sold the "Q" stations to Newcap. By 1990, CFYQ had changed frequencies to 1010. In 1990, CFYQ's program feed changed from CJYQ to CKIX-FM and changed its call letters again to CKXD. In 1999, with the AM equipment nearing the end of its life cycle, CKXD officially made its move to 98.7 FM.
In the early 2000s, CKXD re-branded from KIXX Country to Magic 98 with a hot adult contemporary format, and shortly afterwards to 98.7 K-Rock with a classic rock format. The other two "KIXX" stations outside of St. John's, CKXG-FM in Grand Falls-Windsor and CKXX-FM in Corner Brook, were also branded with the "Magic" name and then subsequently to "K-Rock".

As of March 9, 2022, CKXD no longer originates any local programming from Gander following the closure of its studios and termination of on-air personnel by Stingray. All content of this station is now simulcast from VOCM-FM in St. John's, with the exception of local commercials. CKXD's sister station, CKGA, also shared the same fate as it shared studio facilities and personalities.

Rebroadcasters
CKXD had a rebroadcaster at 670 kHz in Musgravetown (CKXB, originally CJNW in 1975 then CHYQ in 1977) serving Clarenville and the Bonavista Peninsula, but because of problems with the aging transmission equipment that resulted in many breakdowns, the transmitter was shut down in 2003. The Clarenville area is now served by VOCM-FM in St. John's using a repeater (VOCM-FM-1) at 100.7 MHz.

References

External links
 K-Rock
 

Kxd
Kxd
Kxd
Radio stations established in the 20th century
1970s establishments in Newfoundland and Labrador